Verenaisi Ditavutu(born 7 September 1999) is a Fijian rugby sevens player. She was part of the Fijiana sevens team that won the silver medal at the 2022 Commonwealth Games in Birmingham. She also competed at the Rugby World Cup Sevens in Cape Town.

References

1999 births
Living people
Female rugby sevens players
Fijian female rugby union players
Fiji international women's rugby sevens players
Commonwealth Games silver medallists for Fiji
Commonwealth Games medallists in rugby sevens
Rugby sevens players at the 2022 Commonwealth Games
Medallists at the 2022 Commonwealth Games